NGC 4939 is a spiral galaxy located in the constellation Virgo. It is located at a distance of circa 120 million light years from Earth, which, given its apparent dimensions, means that NGC 4939 is about 190,000 light years across. It was discovered by William Herschel on March 25, 1786.

Characteristics 
NGC 4939 has been characterised as a Seyfert galaxy, a galaxy category which features bright point-like nuclei. NGC 4939 is a type II Seyfert galaxy. Its X-ray spectrum is more consistent with a Compton-thick cold reflection source, which means that the source is hidden behind dense material, mainly gas and dust, and the X-rays observed have been reflected, but a Compton-thin transmission model could not be ruled out. The equivalent width of the FeKα line is large, indicating too that it is a Compton-thick source. Further observations by Swift Observatory confirmed its Compton-thick nature. The source of activity in the active galactic nuclei is a supermassive black hole (SMBH) lying at the centre of the galaxy. The black hole has been detected in hard X-rays, which are not absorbed by the Compton-thick column, by INTEGRAL.

The galaxy has a large elliptical bulge and maybe a weak bar. It is a grand design spiral galaxy, with two tightly wrapped arms emanating from the bulge. The arms are thin, smooth and well defined and can be traced for nearly one and a half revolutions before fading. Two symmetric arm sections or arcs are observed in  the central part of the galaxy. The galaxy is seen with an inclination of 56 degrees. The rotational speed of the galaxy is about 270 km/s.

Supernovae 
NGC 4939 has been home of four supernovae in the last 50 years; SN 1968X (mag 16.0), SN 1973J (mag 16), SN 2008aw (Type II, mag 15.9), and SN 2014B (Type IIP, mag 17.0).

Nearby galaxies 
NGC 4939 belongs to a small galaxy group known as the NGC 4933 group, named after the multiple galaxy NGC 4933.

References

External links 

Unbarred spiral galaxies
Seyfert galaxies
Virgo (constellation)
4939
45170
Astronomical objects discovered in 1786
Discoveries by William Herschel